Robat-e Zang (also Romanized as Robāţ-e Zang) is a village in Kharturan Rural District, Beyarjomand District, Shahrud County, Semnan Province, Iran. At the 2006 census, its population was 47, in 13 families.

References 

Populated places in Shahrud County